Through the Storm may refer to:
 Through the Storm: A Real Story of Fame and Family in a Tabloid World, a 2008 book
 Through the Storm (Yolanda Adams album), 1991
 Through the Storm (Aretha Franklin album), 1989
 Through the Storm (Riot album), 2002
 Through the Storm, a 1914 silent film starring Francis X. Bushman
 "Through The Storm", a song by YoungBoy Never Broke Again